The status of cannabis in North Korea is unclear due to the lack of sources available to the outside world. Some observers say that cannabis is effectively legal in North Korea, or at least tolerated, while others argue that this is a misapprehension and that the drug is illegal.

History

Early history
Cannabis was an important crop in ancient Korea, with samples of hempen fabric discovered dating back as early as 3,000 BCE. The traditional sambe cloth is made from hemp.

Modern accounts
In 2010, the American NGO Open Radio for North Korea stated that their source informed them that a crackdown on meth had been announced in Hamkyungbuk-do; however, the crackdown was focused on methamphetamine, with opium and marijuana not being considered "drugs". In 2013, citing sources at NK News and Reddit, Vice News reported that cannabis was widely used and tolerated in North Korea, smoked as ipdambae (잎담배, "leaf tobacco") by the lower classes as a cheap alternative to cigarettes and to relax after a day of labor. According to Lexi De Coning of MassRoots, it is fairly common for North Koreans to grow their own marijuana, or to simply harvest marijuana plants which grow wild across the country.

However, a reply by journalist Keegan Hamilton in a 2014 article in The Guardian sought to debunk these as rumors. He cited Matthew Reichel of the Pyongyang Project who notes that ipdambae is actually a mixture of herbs and tobacco, superficially resembling cannabis but unrelated. Cannabis is cultivated industrially, but in the form of low-THC hemp, and while some people may cultivate personal amounts of psychoactive cannabis, its use is still illegal, though it is also unlikely to be punished severely. A Swedish ambassador to North Korea said in 2017 that "there should be no doubt that drugs, including marijuana, are illegal here. One can't buy it legally and it would be a criminal offense to smoke it; expect no leniency whatsoever."

See also

Legality of cannabis
Smoking in North Korea

References

North Korea
Politics of North Korea
Society of North Korea
Drugs in Korea